The Açunguí River is a river of Paraná state in southern Brazil. It is a headwater of the Ribeira de Iguape River.

Basin
The Açungui river basin is the last natural reserve of unpolluted water to supply the metropolitan region of Curitiba.
The national forest preserves araucarias.

Course

The river rises in the foothills of the Serra de São Luiz do Purunã, Paraná.
The river rises to the northwest of Curitiba and flows in a generally northeast direction to join the Ribeira River, which flows east into São Paulo.
The Açungui valley is steep, with many small canyons and very close to the National Forest, so the environment has been well preserved.
There are rapids along the river, particularly in the Canyon do Acalantilado, making it an excellent place for rafting.

The river's hydroelectric potential has been of interest since the 1950s, but the larger plants on the Iguaçu River gained priority.
Large hydroelectric plants, with their large environmental impact, are now out of fashion, and the potential for a series of small hydroelectric plants along the Açungui was being considered in 2015.

See also
List of rivers of Paraná

References

Sources

Rivers of Paraná (state)